William MacIntyre (c. 1791/92 – 4 March 1857) was a Scottish physician known for publishing the first case report of multiple myeloma in 1850.

MacIntyre graduated from the University of Edinburgh in 1811.

He was appointed to HMS Ramillies as assistant surgeon on 5 December 1812.  In 1820 he married Mary Warren Plowman, sister of the Ramillies surgeon Henry Plowman, and had two daughters.

He then established a successful practice, eventually in Harley Street, London. He was also a consultant to the Western General Dispensary and Metropolitan Convalescent Institution. He became a fellow of the Royal College of Physicians in 1851.

References

George ED, Sadovsky R. Multiple Myeloma: Recognition and Management. American Family Physician 1 April 1999.
Kyle RA. "Multiple myeloma: how did it begin?" Mayo Clin Proc 1994;69:680-3.

Specific

1790s births
1857 deaths
19th-century Scottish medical doctors
Alumni of the University of Edinburgh
Fellows of the Royal College of Physicians
British oncologists
Royal Navy officers
Royal Navy personnel of the Napoleonic Wars
Royal Navy Medical Service officers
Scottish sailors